Batom Airport  is an airport in Batom, Highland Papua, Indonesia.

References

Airports in Highland Papua